Scraptia is a genus of false flower beetles in the family Scraptiidae. There are more than 20 described species in Scraptia.

Species
These 21 species belong to the genus Scraptia:

 Scraptia bifoveolata Kuster, 1853
 Scraptia clairi Rey, 1892
 Scraptia cribriceps Champion
 Scraptia dubia Olivier, 1790
 Scraptia ferruginea Kiesenwetter, 1861
 Scraptia flavidula Motschulsky, 1863
 Scraptia fuscula Müller, 1821
 Scraptia indica Motschulsky, 1863
 Scraptia jakowleffi Reitter, 1889
 Scraptia longicornis Kiesenwetter, 1861
 Scraptia oculata Schaeffer, 1917
 Scraptia oertzeni Schilsky, 1901
 Scraptia ophthalmica Mulsant, 1856
 Scraptia roubali Winkler, 1927
 Scraptia schotti Leblanc, 2012
 Scraptia sericea Melsheimer, 1846
 Scraptia testacea Allen, 1940
 † Scraptia inclusa Ermisch, 1941
 † Scraptia longelytrata Ermisch, 1943
 † Scraptia ovata Guérin-Méneville, 1838
 † Scraptia pseudofuscula Ermisch, 1941

References

Further reading

 
 

Scraptiidae
Articles created by Qbugbot